Wagner-Mozart Music Hall was a historic building located in Mason City, Iowa, United States.  Built in 1936, this was one of, if not the first, building designed for a school music program.  The concrete and brick Moderne structure was designed by Hansen & Waggoner, and built by local workers from the Works Progress Administration who used local materials.  The building contained rehearsal space for instrumental music programs and a large band and orchestra room.  There were two entrances into the building with caps above them.  One was marked "Wagner" and the other "Mozart."  One entrance led into a student vestibule that led to the rehearsal rooms and instrument storage, and the other entrance led to a public vestibule that led to the auditorium/band room.  The building was also made available for community meetings and other non-music functions.  It was listed on the National Register of Historic Places in 1978.  It has subsequently been torn down.

References

Buildings and structures completed in 1936
Buildings and structures in Mason City, Iowa
National Register of Historic Places in Mason City, Iowa
Moderne architecture in Iowa
Event venues on the National Register of Historic Places in Iowa
Works Progress Administration in Iowa